Kim Rowe (born 17 December 1952) is a Jamaican sprinter. He competed in the men's 4 × 400 metres relay at the 1972 Summer Olympics.

References

1952 births
Living people
Athletes (track and field) at the 1972 Summer Olympics
Athletes (track and field) at the 1974 British Commonwealth Games
Athletes (track and field) at the 1975 Pan American Games
Jamaican male sprinters
Olympic athletes of Jamaica
Place of birth missing (living people)
Commonwealth Games competitors for Jamaica
Pan American Games competitors for Jamaica